David Hutto (born September 4, 1975) is an American rapper from Covington, Georgia. A representative of the hip hop subgenres rap rock, horrorcore and country rap, Hutto is most commonly known as Boondox, whose stage persona is a killer scarecrow, and Turncoat Dirty.

Biography
Hutto was born in Richmond County, Georgia, but grew up in Covington, Georgia . Hutto was not popular at his school, frequently got into fights, and experimented with drug use. He listened to heavy metal bands such as Iron Maiden, Metallica, and Sepultura, and he played bass guitar in several local metal bands throughout the early 2000s before being a member of "Southern Hustlas Inc." and seeking a solo career as a rapper under the name "Turncoat Dirty".

Signing to Psychopathic Records, creating Boondox, The Harvest era (2005–2006)
Hutto caught the attention of Insane Clown Posse while selling his cassettes at one of their concerts. Following several phone calls with group member Joseph Bruce, Hutto was signed to Psychopathic Records, making him the first Southern hip hop performer on the label. Bruce and Joseph Utsler helped Hutto create the character Boondox, which took six months to fully develop. Hutto released his first album under the Boondox name, The Harvest, on July 11, 2006. A music video directed by Bruce was filmed for the album's first single, "They Pray With Snakes" and Hutto toured with Blaze Ya Dead Homie to promote the album. The second music video from the album is "Red Mist" (ft. Twiztid & Blaze Ya Dead Homie).

PunkinHed EP era (2007)
In 2007, Hutto released the extended play PunkinHed. It peaked at No. 10 on the Billboard Top Heatseekers chart and No. 27 on the Top Independent Albums chart. During the same year, he joined Psychopathic Rydas, performing under the name "Yung Dirt".

Krimson Creek era (2008–2009)
On May 13, 2008, Hutto released his second studio album, Krimson Creek, a more personal work drawing from his past. It peaked No. 1 on the Billboard Top Heatseekers chart, No. 13 on the Top Independent Albums chart, and No. 113 on the Billboard 200. A music video for "Inbred Evil" was released in the summer of 2008.

South of Hell era (2010–2012) 
Hutto released his third studio album, South of Hell, on May 11, 2010. The album also features a documentary directed by Paul Andreson about Hutto's life and the making of the album titled Southern Bled. It was his highest charting album, peaking at #54 in the Billboard 200.

Departure from Psychopathic Records, restarting Turncoat Dirty (2012–2013)
In early 2012 Boondox released 2 songs from his upcoming album. The two songs were "Abaddon" and "Monster". He said they were released as a thank-you to all the fans that have stood by him, and have supported him. He said that he has about 10 songs done for the album. In May 2012, Boondox's Twitter account was "hacked", and Hutto announced that he would be leaving Psychopathic because of personal issues, but is still on good terms with the label. He also plans to release a gangsta rap album independently under the alias Turncoat Dirty, and is currently in the production of a new Boondox album. Boondox teamed up with Bukshot and ClaAs to form the group The Underground Avengers, and they released their debut EP, Skarecrows, Weirdos & ClaAsholes at the 2012 GOTJ. It was announced on October 3, 2012 on Boondox's official Twitter page that he will continue rapping as Turncoat Dirty, but will be temporarily finished with the Boondox character at the end of 2012.

In February 2013, Hutto announced that he would be releasing another album as Boondox later that year (T.B.A) and was also working on a new The Underground Avengers album (T.B.A). Both Boondox and The Underground Avengers were scheduled to appear at the GOTJ in 2013. In early 2013, 2 songs were released, credited to Turncoat Dirty, one of which was "Hell or Jail".

Return to Psychopathic Records (2013)
It was announced at the Gathering of the Juggalos in 2013 that Boondox is back on the label. Boondox went on the Australian leg of Insane Clown Posse's The Mighty Death Pop! Tour, from December 4, 2013 through December 8, 2013.

In February 2014, during an interview, Boondox, alongside the other 2 members of The Underground Avengers (Bukshot & ClaAs), was asked about his new album on Psychopathic. He said that it was finished and should be out hopefully around April or May 2014. Another question was asked about a new Avengers album and tour, and all seemed uncertain due to all three of them being busy with their own stuff right now, but it was said that if they do, it would be out in the summer of 2014.

Abaddon era (2014–2015)
In the March 14, 2014 Hatchet Herald it was announced the new Boondox album is titled Abaddon and it will be released on May 13, 2014. No track list has yet to be given, but it is a guess that the album will be the 10 songs he recorded before he left Psychopathic in May 2012, including the songs "Abaddon" and "Monster", and a few new recorded songs. That is still unknown. To promote the album Boondox announced on his official Twitter, that he will be going on tour titled "The Wormwood Tour" soon with Aqualeo & Bukshot, the tour also featured rapper/singer Crucifix who collaborated on the song "Betrayal". On April 18, 2014 the track list for Abaddon was released. The album will feature guest appearances from artists such as Big Hoodoo, Violent J, Crucifix, Insane Clown Posse, Jelly Roll, Demi Demaree & Syn. The album does include the 2 songs "Abaddon" and "Monster". During his 2014 GOTJ seminar he announced that he is going to not do a Turncoat Dirty album because something bad always happens, also he is doing a project with Crucifix, who was featured on the song "Betrayal" off Boondox's last album Abaddon, and did a single with Boondox and Bukshot titled "Don't Stop", which was a cover of Journey's hit song "Don't Stop Believin'". He also stated that his next album will be the most "wickedest, darkest shit he can possibly come up with". Boondox went on "The Family Fun Time Tour" with Anybody Killa and Big Hoodoo from November 26 – December 31, 2014. The tour also featured a 2-song set by ABK & Big Hoodoo group (Tha Hav Knots).

Boondox will be going on tour with Majik Ninja Entertainment and former Psychopathic Records artist Blaze Ya Dead Homie, on MNE's first tour and the first PSY/MNE Tour, titled "Back From The Dead Tour" which kicks off February 14, 2015 and coincides with Twiztid's "Be My Bloody Valentine Show" and concludes March 11, 2015. Boondox will be going back on tour with Blaze Ya Dead Homie and MNE's third tour, and the second Psychopathic Records/Majik Ninja Entertainment tour, titled, The Underground Assault Tour, which takes place in Australia from June 25, 2015 through June 28, 2015. They will be accompanied on the tour by Australian native Kid Crusher. Boondox will go on the third Psychopathic Records/Majik Ninja Entertainment tour, titled Welcome To The Underground Tour with Twiztid, Blaze Ya Dead Homie, Prozak, Wolfpac and Scum, scheduled for fall 2015. Boondox has also stated that he is soon to begin work on new music. During his GOTJ 2014 seminar he was asked if he was leaving Psychopathic Records to sign with Majik Ninja Entertainment, and he replied that "it was all speculation". He also stated in his seminar that he is working on his new album, and that it is mostly being produced by Seven.

The Murder Era (2016–2018)
It was announced on December 10, 2016 that The Murder will be out in 2017. The first single from the album titled PYEO (Peck Your Eyes Out) was released on December 10, 2016 and was accompanied by a music video. On December 30, 2016 it was announced that The Murder will be released on March 24, 2017, and Boondox will go on tour starting in March to promote the album (The Murder Tour) with supporting acts Blaze Ya Dead Homie and Lex "The Hex" Master.

On January 1, 2017 Boondox was invited to the Juggalo March On Washington. On January 4, 2017 via Majik Ninja Entertainment Facebook account, it was announced that no one from the label would take part in the March, but will take part in the 2017 Juggalo Day Show: Tales From The Lotus Pod. In a January 19, 2017 Insane Clown Posse, it was announced that all Majik Ninja Entertainment artists have been removed from Juggalo Day Show: Tales From The Lotus Pod and replaced. Boondox will also be performing on the Eat Your Heart Out Tour (Twiztid, Blaze Ya Dead Homie, Boondox, Lex "The Hex" Master, G-Mo Skee, and The R.O.C.). On January 29, 2017 the cover art for The Murder was released. On February 8, 2017 the official tour flyer was posted via Boondox's Facebook page. During the summer of 2017, Boondox performed at Shiner Fest, a festival that is put on annually by Moonshine Bandits.

New Album & Return of Turncoat Dirty (2018)
On July 13, 2017 via Twitter, it was announced that Boondox is working on a follow up to The Murder. In August 2017, Bukshot posted a flyer to social media asking if people would genuinely be interested in a reunion of The Underground Avengers (Boondox, Bukshot, ClaAs) and a possible album of new music? Shortly after the flyer was posted it was announced that TUA would be performing on March 30, 2018 in Fort Worth, Texas.

On November 16, 2017 Boondox announced via Facebook that he was going up to "The Dojo" in January 2018 to start recording for an album that has been a long time in the making. On November 20, 2017 via Facebook, after announcing that he was selling TCD merch that was over 4 years old Boondox restated that he will be heading back up to the DOJO in mid January 2018 to start work on a new project a long time in the making, and that 2018 may see multiple releases from him as well, including a Turncoat Dirty album.

On January 12, 2018 Boondox posted to Facebook a picture  of new Turncoat Dirty T-shirt that he will put up for sale, with the date soon to be announced. It also furthers the hype of new TCD material.

In mid March 2018 twiztid-shop released an Audio Box for Boondox, and inside was a CD containing 2 brand new Turncoat Dirty songs. In late March 2018 during a Brunch N Bake with Monoxide Child stated that Boondox would probably have 4 brand new projects out on Majik Ninja Entertainment in 2018.

On April 25, 2018 Boondox released the album cover for his new Turncoat Dirty album titled Dirty Days Of Night, and will also be a part of the MNE's Welcome To The Underground Series. On April 27, 2018 the preorder bundles were released for Dirty Days Of Night EP,  with release date set for May 17, 2018.

On May 14, 2018 it was announced that the supergroup The Underground Avengers (Boondox, Bukshot & ClaAs) was signed to the label. In mid July the preorders for the album went up, with the title of the album released, Anomally 88 which will be released on August 31, 2018. The song Thanos will feature, Twiztid, Tech N9ne, Krizz Kaliko, Rittz, King ISO & Lyte.

In late July 2018 it was announced that Majik Ninja Entertainment artists Twiztid and Boondox would be performing at the 2018 Blue Ridge Festival.

On August 1, 2018 Bukshot took to facebook to announce that Lyte's feature on Thanos has been removed, stating in part: "Neither Twiztid, me, MNE or Lyte had anything to do with it being removed. I'll let you connect the dots".

On Black Friday 2018, preorders went up for Boondox's new album titled Liquor, Lies & Legacy set to be released on January 18, 2019 alongside Gorilla Voltage's new album Gods & Claws.

In December 2020, Krimsom Crow was released.

Style

Hutto's music is an amalgamation of the "Southern twang of banjos and harmonicas" with hip hop. It combines elements of country with hip hop beats and funk-derived grooves, and includes live instrumentation, including slide guitar and banjos. Hutto also used Auto-Tune on his song "We All Fall". His lyrics center around Southern culture, doom, gloom, and murder, as well as partying. Hutto is also known for his confessional lyrics dealing with his childhood; one of Hutto's songs described an incident in which his uncle tried to kill him by drowning him in a swimming pool, and other lyrics have dealt with his getting into fights at his school and experiments with drugs. Jeffries described the song "Family Tree" as an example of Hutto as "a strong and even serious lyricist".

Hutto cites Insane Clown Posse as an influence. Allmusic's David Jeffries described Hutto's music as a cross between Kid Rock and Insane Clown Posse. His music has been classified as rap rock, country rap and horrorcore.

Discography

The Harvest (2006) 
Krimson Creek (2008) 
South of Hell (2010)
Abaddon (2014) 
The Murder (2017) 
Krimson Crow (2020)

Supergroup Membership
Psychopathic Rydas (w/Bullet, Full Clip, Lil Shank, Foe Foe, Cell Block, Sawed Off) (performed as Yung Dirt)
The Underground Avengers (w/Bukshot & ClaAs)

Supergroups
Psychopathic Rydas (2007-2012; 2013-2017)
The Underground Avengers (2012-2014; 2017–present)

Filmography
A Family Underground (2008)
Southern Bled (2010)
Big Money Rustlas (2010)

References

External links
 Official website
 

Horrorcore artists
Living people
People from Covington, Georgia
People from Richmond County, Georgia
Majik Ninja Entertainment artists
Psychopathic Records artists
Southern hip hop musicians
Underground rappers
Rappers from Georgia (U.S. state)
21st-century American rappers
Psychopathic Rydas members
1975 births